Acanthophila liui is a moth in the family Gelechiidae. It is found in China (Anhui, Jiangxi) and Russia, where it is known only from the southern part of Primorsky Krai.

References

liui
Moths described in 1996
Moths of Asia